Christopher Kas and Viktor Troicki are the defending champions, but they decided not to participate this year.

Top seeded Oliver Marach and Aisam-ul-Haq Qureshi won the tournament beating unseeded German couple Michael Kohlmann and Alexander Waske in the final, 7–6(7–4), 7–6(7–5).

Seeds

Draw

Draw

References
Main Draw

Doubles
PTT Thailand Open - Doubles
 in Thai tennis